Cicloprolol is a beta-adrenoceptor antagonist.

Synthesis

See also
 Betaxolol

References

Beta blockers
Cyclopropanes
N-isopropyl-phenoxypropanolamines